Szczecin paprikash (Polish: Paprykarz szczeciński), also known as Polish paprikash, is a Polish canned fish spread made from ground fish, rice, tomato paste and vegetable oil, seasoned with onion, salt and spices. It has the form of a reddish-brown paste with visible rice grains. The recipe, inspired by a West African dish sampled by Polish fishermen, was developed in the 1960s at a state-owned far-sea fishing and fish processing company based in the port city of Szczecin, in northwestern Poland. It is a popular snack, especially with students, and remains a symbol of Szczecin's local identity.

Etymology 
The term  is Polish. The word  refers to a spicy stew seasoned with paprika, or powdered chili pepper. It derives from Hungarian , which denotes a dish of meat (beef, veal, pork or chicken) stewed with onions, paprika and sour cream, known outside of Hungary as a variant of goulash.

Description 
The ingredients of  differ by producer, but they typically include ground fish of various kinds, tomato paste, rice, onion, vegetable oil and spices. A Polish standard introduced in 1967 specifies "Nigerian pepper" as the principal spice. The spread is a uniform paste of light to dark red or reddish-brown color, with visible grains of rice. The consistency is firm, ranging from slightly dry to juicy with a possible thin layer of oil on the surface. The product is sterilized and packed into steel or aluminum cans.

History

Its invention was a result of an efficiency improvement project whose goal was to find a way to use up fish scraps left over from cutting blocks of frozen fish on 's fishing trawlers. The recipe was developed in  laboratories between 1965 and 1967. The company's far-sea fishing activity at that time was located off the coast of West Africa. The dish contained fish, rice and a hot spice called "pima". In 1967, Jakacki and his colleagues were issued a certificate for rationalization proposal, which, under communist intellectual property law, awarded them limited property rights to their improvement idea and allowed to put it in place.

Originally,  contained scraps of various kinds of fish caught off the West African coast, such as red porgy, as well as tomato pulp imported from the southern countries of the Eastern Bloc – Bulgaria, Hungary and Romania – and a spice imported from Nigeria. The fish component changed with time, as  moved its fishing fleet to new locations; at various points, the paste contained Alaska pollock and blue grenadier from the Pacific Ocean or southern blue whiting from the waters around the Falkland Islands. By the end of the 1960s, the company had left the West African waters due to the Nigerian Civil War; in 1977, it moved out of the northern Pacific Ocean when Canada and the United States claimed their exclusive economic zones; and in 1982, it had to abandon the Falkland waters because of the Argentine-British war.

Due to its low price and long shelf life, the spread quickly gained popularity among Polish students, artists and hikers. The product became Poland's export hit that was sold to 32 countries, including Côte d'Ivoire, Denmark, Hungary, Japan, Jordan, Liberia, the Soviet Union, Togo and the United States. According to 's internal report, the recipe was copied in Colombia, which exported its own version of the fish spread to neighboring countries.

An economic downturn, which hit Poland in the 1980s, resulted in inferior quality of the product. The Nigerian spice was replaced with cheaper Hungarian paprika and the original fish content of 50 percent was reduced in favor of rice. It was common to find fragments of fins, scales and bones in the paste. During the food shortages of the time, cans of the fish paste often remained on grocery shelves along with vinegar as the only food products available.

With Poland's transition from command to market economy in the early 1990s, Polish far-sea fishing business became economically unsustainable, bringing Gryf to bankruptcy. According to Borysowicz,  was protected by a patent, but the documents were lost during the company's liquidation. Several other Polish companies tried, without success, to obtain a patent for the same product in the 1990s and 2000s. In 2010, the Polish Ministry of Agriculture and Rural Development placed  on an official list of traditional products, per request from the West Pomeranian regional authorities. While this recognition itself does not grant the recipe any legal protection, it is considered a first step for Szczecin towards having the paste's name and geographic indication protected under European Union law.

In culture 

 was one of the most recognizable brands in communist Poland. Due to its popularity and association with the main city of West Pomerania, it has become a part of Szczecin's post-war local identity even though it is no longer produced in this city.

Notes

References

Sources 
 
 
 
 
 
 
 
 
 
 
 

Fish dishes
Polish cuisine
Rice dishes
Szczecin
Food and drink introduced in the 1960s